A well car, also known as a double-stack car (or also intermodal car/container car), is a type of railroad car specially designed to carry intermodal containers (shipping containers) used in intermodal freight transport. The "well" is a depressed section which sits close to the rails between the wheel trucks of the car, allowing a container to be carried lower than on a traditional flatcar.  This makes it possible to carry a stack of two containers per unit on railway lines (double-stack rail transport) wherever the structure gauge assures sufficient clearance.  The top container is secured to the bottom container either by a bulkhead built into the car (e.g., bottom and top containers are the same dimensions of 40 ft.), or through the use of inter-box connectors (IBC). Four IBCs are needed per wellcar. In the process of an inbound train becoming an outbound train, there are four processes: unlock to unload the top container of inbound train, remove then unload bottom container, insert after loading bottom container of outbound train, lock after top container loaded.

Advantages to using well cars include increased stability due to the lower center of gravity of the load, lower tare weight, and in the case of articulated units, reduced slack action.

Well cars are most common in North America and Australia where intermodal traffic is heavy and electrification is less widespread; thus overhead clearances are typically more manageable.

History 

Southern Pacific Railroad (SP), along with Malcom McLean, devised the first double-stack intermodal car in 1977. SP then designed the first car with ACF Industries that same year. At first it was slow to become an industry standard, then in 1984 American President Lines started working with the Thrall Company to develop a refined well car and with the Union Pacific to operate a train service using the new well cars. That same year, the first all "double stack" train left Los Angeles for South Kearny, New Jersey, under the name of "Stacktrain" rail service. Along the way the train transferred from the UP to CNW and then to Conrail.

Multiple unit cars 
Each unit of a double-stack car is constructed with a single well, but are often constructed with multiple units of three to five units, connected by articulated connectors.  Articulated connectors are supported by the centerplate of a single truck, (often a 125-short-ton, 112-long-ton or 113-tonne capacity truck but sometimes a 150-short-ton, 134-long-ton or 136-tonne capacity one).

Also, in a number of cases, multiple single-well cars (usually 3 or 5) are connected by drawbars and share a single reporting mark.

On both types of multiple-unit cars, the units are typically distinguished by letters, with the unit on one end being the "A" unit, and the unit on the other end being the "B" unit.  Middle units are labeled starting with "C", and going up to "E" for five-unit cars starting from the "B" unit and increasing towards the "A" unit.

Carrying capacity 

Double-stack wellcars come in a number of sizes, related to the standard sizes of the containers they are designed to carry. A number of  wells and  wells also exist. (The sizes of wells are frequently marked in large letters on the sides of cars to assist yard workers in locating suitable equipment for freight loads.)

On 40 ft, 45 ft, 48 ft, or 53 ft cars, larger containers (45 ft or up) are often placed on top of smaller containers that fit in the available wells to efficiently use all available space. All wells are also capable of carrying two 20 ft ISO containers in the bottom position.

Some double-stack well cars have been also equipped with hitches which allow them to carry semi-trailers as well as containers.  These are known as "all-purpose" well cars.

As highway weight limits in the US restrict most containers to less than  this is adequate for two containers stacked. Some single well cars have capacity for two fully loaded  containers.

Econo Stack or Twin Stack well car

Econo Stack well cars are a variation of conventional well cars and their main purpose is to give the double stacked containers more support.  The down side to them is they do not allow 53-foot containers to be stacked on top, but 45-foot containers still fit and are able to be stacked on top.

Gallery

Usage 
  – double stack trains operate between Perth, Adelaide, Darwin and Parkes, NSW with  clearances. , the Inland Railway between Melbourne and Brisbane was being be built for operation of double stacked trains using wellcars.
  – using double stacked container trains under 25 kV AC overhead lines using X2H and X2K type wellcars manufactured by CRRC. Even after increasing the height of the overhead wire it is not possible to use a stack of two   hi-cube containers on the lines under electrification, even in well cars.
 – The Mombasa-Nairobi standard gauge railway operates double-stacked trains using X2K type wellcars manufactured by CRRC, the first such trains being launched on October 1, 2018. 
  – the Panama Canal Railway runs double stack trains using well cars manufactured by Gunderson Inc.
  – Saudi Railways Organization line to Dammam.

Choke points 
Low bridges and narrow tunnels in various locations prevent the operation of double-stack trains until costly upgrades are made. Some Class I railroad companies in the U.S. have initiated improvement programs to remove obstructions to double-stack trains. Examples include the Heartland Corridor (Norfolk Southern Railway) and National Gateway (CSX Transportation).

See also 

 Kangourou wagon
 Lowmac
 Pocket wagon
 Slack action
 Tiphook
 Well wagon

References

Online rosters 
 Double Stack Cars - A list of double stack cars by reporting mark, with various data
 RR Rolling Stock Category: Double Stack Car - Picture Archives

Magazine articles 
 Mainline Modeler:
 Fortenberry, Curt & Bill McKean. - "APL Container Car". - February 1987. - p.65-69.
 Fortenberry, Curt & Robert L. Hundman. - "APL container car part II the brake system". - March 1987. - p.78-81.
 Hundman, Robert L., & Curt Fortenberry. - "APL 45-foot container car". - May 1987. - p.54-57.

 Model Railroader:
 Durrenberger, Cyril. - "SP/ACF double stack cars". - October 1983. - p.83-93.

 Model Railroading:
 Bontrager, David A. - "Articulated double stacks: a prototype overview". - June 1993. p.24-29.
 Bontrager, David A. - "The Newest Prototype Well Cars: An Abundance of Kitbashing Possibilities".  August 1997. - p.46-49.
 Casdorph, David G. and Ed McCaslin. - "Gunderson's Husky-Stack: The Prototype and Detailing A-Line's HO Model". - October 1995. - p.32-37.
 Casdorph, David G. - "NSC 53' Drawbarred Well Car Roster and Pictorial". - August 2002. - p.30-33
 Geiger, Doug. - "Thrall Double-Stacks: Three-Well DTTX Drawbar-Connected Car". - October 1994. - p.50-55.
 Geiger, Doug. - "Gunderson Husky Stack Three-Well BN Drawbar-Connected Car". - July 1995. - p.48-53.
 Geiger, Doug. - "Gunderson Maxi-Stack IIIs Part I: The Prototype". - December 1995. - p.58-63.
 Geiger, Doug. - "Maxi-Stack Well Car Part I: The Prototype". - April 1997. - p.28-31.
 Mansfield, Jim. - "Thrall Five-Unit Double-Stack Car - Series TWG50J". - October 1993. - p.19-23.
 Mansfield, Jim. - "Thrall Five-Unit Double-Stack Car - Series APLX 5000". - November 1993. - p.24-25, 27-31.

Railroad Model Craftsman:
 Panza, Jim & Chuck Yungkurth. - "Thrall's double-stack cars". - January 1989. - p.89-98.
 Panza, Jim & Bruce Keating. - "The Gunderson Husky-Stack well car". - July 1992. - p.71-75.
 Panza, Jim & William Halliar. - "Thrall stand-alone and drawbar connected well cars". - October 1992. - p.64-68.

External links 
 Freight Cars
 http://people.hofstra.edu/geotrans/eng/ch3en/conc3en/pbdblstk.html  The  here mentioned is too low, it is more like  AAR "plate" loading gauge diagrams compared to UIC, Plate "H", (pdf & Autocad)
 A Partnership of Two Old Rivals, Time Magazine, June 7, 1954
 Guide to Rail Cars
 Association of American Railroads Mechanical Division, page 238
 Greenbrier 53’ All-Purpose double-stack well car

Freight rolling stock
Intermodal containers